Charles George (1932–1952) was a U.S. Army soldier and Medal of Honor recipient.

Charles George may also refer to:

 Greek George (Charles Peter George, 1912–1999), catcher in Major League Baseball
 Charles George (equestrian) (1886–1946), American equestrian
 Charles Joseph George (died 1906), Saro trader
 Charles Frederick George (born 1941), English physician
 Charlie George (born 1950), English footballer

See also
 
 
 George Charles (disambiguation)